Kenneth Kellett ( – ) was a professional rugby league footballer who played in the 1970s and 1980s.

Playing career

Kellett made his début for Featherstone Rovers on Tuesday 29 September 1970, and he played his last match for Featherstone Rovers during the 1982–83 season.

Championship appearances
Kellett played in Featherstone Rovers' victory in Championship during the 1976–77 season.

Challenge Cup Final appearances
Kellett played , i.e. number 5, in Featherstone Rovers' 33-14 victory over Bradford Northern in the 1973 Challenge Cup Final during the 1972–73 season at Wembley Stadium, London on Saturday 12 May 1973, in front of a crowd of 72,395, and played  in the 14-12 victory over Hull F.C. in the 1983 Challenge Cup Final during the 1982–83 season at Wembley Stadium, London on Saturday 7 May 1983, in front of a crowd of 84,969.

County Cup Final appearances
Kellett played , i.e. number 5, in Featherstone Rovers' 12-16 defeat by Leeds in the 1976 Yorkshire County Cup Final during the 1976–77 season at Headingley Rugby Stadium, Leeds on Saturday 16 October 1976, and played  in the 7-17 defeat by Castleford in the 1977 Yorkshire County Cup Final during the 1977–78 season at Headingley Rugby Stadium, Leeds on Saturday 15 October 1977.

Testimonial match
Kellett's benefit season at Featherstone Rovers took place during the 1980–81 season.

References

External links
Statistics at rugbyleagueproject.org
A FEATHERSTONE ROVERS BLOG: Ken Kellett
Cyril Kellett, Dave Kellett and Brian Kellett - a featherstone rovers blog
A FEATHERSTONE ROVERS BLOG: Paul Coventry
The Story of Wembley 1983. Part I - a featherstone rovers blog
The Story of Wembley 1983. Part II - a featherstone rovers blog
The Story of Wembley 1983. Part III - a featherstone rovers blog
The Story of Wembley 1983. Part IV - a featherstone rovers blog
The Story of Wembley 1983. Part V - a featherstone rovers blog
The Story of Wembley 1983. Part VI - a featherstone rovers blog
The Story of Wembley 1983. Part VII - a featherstone rovers blog
The Story of Wembley 1983. Part VIII - a featherstone rovers blog
The Story of Wembley 1983. Part IX - a featherstone rovers blog
The Story of Wembley 1983. Part X - a featherstone rovers blog
Search for "Ken Kellett" at britishnewspaperarchive.co.uk
Search for "Kenneth Kellett" at britishnewspaperarchive.co.uk

1946 births
1989 deaths
English rugby league players
Featherstone Rovers players
Rugby league wingers
Place of birth unknown
Place of death unknown